Andrés García (born May 24, 1941) is a Dominican-born Mexican actor. He has formerly served as a scuba diving instructor in Acapulco.

Career
García was born and raised in Santo Domingo, Dominican Republic. He is the son of Spanish exiles from the Spanish Civil War who received refuge in the country during the regime of Rafael Leónidas Trujillo. His father was a Spanish Republican combat aviator named Andrés García La Calle. 

Garcia emigrated to Mexico, where he obtained Mexican nationality and pursued a career in show business. During the late 1960s and early 1970s, he became a sex symbol in Mexico and the rest of Latin America, participating in movies, Spanish soap operas and photo-romance novels (magazine featuring photos of actors who create a story—a popular phenomenon across Latin America during the 1970s).

In 1985 García participated in Tú o nadie, with Lucía Mendez and Salvador Pineda. Tú o nadie became a major hit and helped García to receive many international offers. He accepted an offer to go to Puerto Rico in 1986, where he acted in the soap operas Amame, with Johanna Rosaly, and Escándalo, with Iris Chacón and Charytín. Escándalo flopped, and the number of episodes recorded for that soap opera was cut in half by the television channel.

Personal life

In September 2003, he made one of his several appearances on Cristina, the Spanish-language talk show hosted by Cristina Saralegui, to defend entertainers against paparazzi. García has participated in over 50 different projects, including film, theater, soap opera and photo-opera work.

García has also been involved romantically, and remains friends, with Mexican model Carmen Campuzano and Puerto Rican singer Zeny, from the pop vocal duet Zeny & Zory.

In 2005, García participated in a reality show titled El Principe Azul (Blue Prince), a show geared toward finding his other son, Leonardo. García began to flirt with the young women on the show, going as far as having an on camera kiss with one of the contestants, making his son grow frustrated, and eventually, he left the show. Two previously unknown men were then cast to participate in the show and try to conquer one of the ladies involved in it. In 2006, he starred in the soap opera El Cuerpo del Deseo, broadcast by Telemundo International. The script of this telenovela is about transmigration, the passing of a soul into another body after death, coinciding with García's beliefs on this subject.

Filmography 

2007: El Pantera .... Rubio Barrios (2007–2008)
2002: Hospital Central (2002–2007)
2005: El cuerpo del deseo .... Pedro Jose Donoso
2005: La última noche .... Fabián
2004: El Cristo de plata
2002: King of Texas .... Davis
2002: Detras del paraíso
1999-2000: Mujeres engañadas .... Javier Duarte (1999-2000)
1999: Puppet .... Gandolier
1998-1999: El Privilegio De Amar .... Andrés Duval (husband of Luciana and father of Victor Manuel) (1998-1999)
1997: Noi siamo angeli ... a.k.a. "We Are Angels"
1996: Los matones de mi pueblo
1996: Con toda el alma .... Daniel Linares
1995: Morir mil muertes
1995: El tigre Murrieta
1994: El justiciero
1994: El jinete de acero .... Pedro Grande
1992: Perros de presa ... a.k.a. Los fugitivos (Mexico)
1991: La mujer prohibida .... Hernán Gallardo
1990: Sueño y despertar de Aurelio Marítimo
1990: El magnate .... Gonzalo
1990: El día de los Albañiles IV
1990: Herencia maldita
1989: Programado para morir
1989: Entre compadres te veas
1989: Que viva el merengue y la lambada
1989: Deuda saldada
1989: Buscando la muerte
1988: Solicito marido para engañar .... Fabián Conde Mariscal
1988: Mi fantasma y yo
1988: Los plomeros y las ficheras
1988: Mi nombre es coraje .... Juan
1987: El niño y el Papa .... Carlos
1987: Asesino nocturno
1986: Los Amantes del Señor de la Noche .... Amante de Amparo
1986: El hijo de Pedro Navaja .... Pedro Navaja
1986: Río de oro .... Rodolfo
1986: El cafre
1986: Herencia maldita
1985: Sangre en el Caribe
1985: Toña machetes
1985: La risa alarga la vida y algo mas
1985: Tú o nadie .... Antonio Lombardo
1984: Pedro Navaja .... Pedro Navaja
1983: Dos de abajo
1983: Las modelos de desnudos
1983: Chile picante .... (segment "La Infidelidad") ... a.k.a. "Sexo a la Mexicana"
1983: El día del compadre .... Pepe
1983: Sexo vs. sexo
1983: La venganza de Maria
1983: Se me sale cuando me río
1983: El Cazador de demonios .... Melquiades Franco
1983: Inseminación artificial
1982: Una gallina muy ponedora ... a.k.a. Amor a navaja libre
1982: La leyenda del tambor ... a.k.a. El niño del tambor (Mexico) ... a.k.a. Timbaler del Bruc (Mexico)
1981: D.F./Distrito Federal
1981: Mi nombre es Sergio, soy alcoholico
1981: Las mujeres de Jeremías .... Pancho
1981: El sexo sentido
1981: El macho bionico
1980: Las cabareteras
1980: Mírame con ojos pornográficos .... Jose de Lugo ... a.k.a. "El sexologo"
1980: Las tentadoras
1980: Carnada ... a.k.a. "La pasión del fenix"
1980: El siete vidas
1980: Dos hermanos murieron
1980: Amigo
1980: Y ahora, que?
1980: El jinete de la muerte
1979: Muñecas de medianoche
1979: Nora la rebelde
1979: Day of the Assassin .... Beltron
1979: Encuentro en el abiso .... Scott
1979: El giro, el pinto, y el Colorado
1979: Carlos el terrorista .... Carlos
1978: Cyclone .... Andrés
1978: Bermude: la fossa maledetta .... Andres Montoya
1978: El cuatro dedos
1978: The Bermuda Triangle .... Alan
1978: Cuchillo .... Cuchillo
1978: Suave, cariño, muy suave
1978: Manaos .... Carmelo Sierra ... a.k.a. Rebelión en la selva (Mexico)
1977: La llamada del sexo ... a.k.a. Dulcemente morirás por amor (Mexico)
1977: ¡Tintorera! .... Miguel
1976: El trinquetero
1975: Aventuras de un caballo blanco y un niño
1975: Paloma .... Daniel
1974: La amargura de mi raza
1974: La corona de un campeon
1973: Morirás con el sol (Motociclistas suicidas) .... Carlos Rodríguez
1973: El principio
1973: Besos, besos... y mas besos
1973: Ana del aire .... Jorge
1973: Adios, New York, adios
1972: Nadie te querrá como yo .... Javier
1972: El negocio del odio
1972: El carruaje .... Teniente Azcárate
1972: Las gemelas .... Leonardo Lobo
1971: Velo de Novia
1971: Los destrampados
1970: Paraíso .... Lauro
1970: La rebelion de las hijas
1970: El cinico .... Rogelio
1970: Los juniors
1970: Juan el desalmado
1970: Las tres magnificas
1970: Tres amigos
1970: La sonrisa del diablo .... Carlos
1969: Super Colt 38 .... Roy
1969: Minifaldas con espuelas
1969: Pacto diabólico
1968: Los asesinos .... Joseph Nelson
1968: House of Evil .... Beasley
1968: Muchachas, muchachas, muchachas
1967: Chanoc .... Chanoc ... a.k.a. "Aventuras de mar y selva"

Stage
 "Juguetes Para el Matrimonio"
 "Las Buenas Personas"
 "Las Buenas Imagenes Publicas"
 "Accidente Conyugal"
 "Amor es"
 "La Libelula"
 "Las Locuras del Sexo"
 "Un Loco Genial"
 "Las Mentiras Blancas y la Comedia Negra"
 "Me Dicen Pedro, el Hombre de la Navaja"

References

External links
Andrés Garcia Biography

1941 births
Living people
Mexican male film actors
Mexican male telenovela actors
Mexican male television actors
Naturalized citizens of Mexico
Mexican people of Spanish descent
People from Acapulco
Dominican Republic emigrants to Mexico
Dominican Republic people of Spanish descent
Dominican Republic people of Basque descent
Mexican people of Basque descent
People from Santo Domingo